Henrik Eriksson (born April 15, 1990) is a professional Swedish ice hockey player. As of 2014–2015 he is a right winger for Djurgårdens IF Hockey in HockeyAllsvenskan. Eriksson previously played for Mora IK in HockeyAllsvenskan. Eriksson played in Djurgården junior teams before making his debut in the senior team.

Career statistics

References

External links

1990 births
Djurgårdens IF Hockey players
Living people
Mora IK players
Swedish ice hockey right wingers
Ice hockey people from Stockholm